New Brooklyn is a 2008 feature film directed by Christopher Cannucciari, starring Blanca Lewin, Matt Cavenaugh, Frank Harts, Pablo Cerda, Kat Ross and Frank Nasso.

New Brooklyn is Blanca Lewin's first feature film in English. Her previous works include; Sangre Eterna,  and En la cama. The film was released to various film festivals beginning late Fall 2008. The film is a drama about the movable and unmovable obstacles in the lives of Brooklyn dwellers, centering on the story of a recent South American arrival, Marta Piro (Blanca Lewin). The film includes a mix of professional actors and Brooklyn non actors.

Synopsis
"Brooklyn is in transition from warehouses and barrios to a gentrified playground of boutiques and ultra-modern condominiums. New Brooklyn is a gritty depiction of survival alongside a tumultuously changing city."

Plot
Marta and Angela are Brooklyn roommates. Angela has lived in Brooklyn her whole life, Marta has recently arrived from South America. Marta becomes exploited by both the city and Angela's brother, Eddie. She desperately waits for her Chilean boyfriend, Alvaro to arrive and make things better. Marta, it seems, is a woman with her life on hold. She moved from Chile to get work as an actress in New York, but she spends all of her free time talking about and waiting for her boyfriend, Alvaro (Pablo Cerda), to join her from Chile. Once he arrives, however, he is so supremely uninterested in her that he rarely makes eye contact with her and bolts from the apartment as soon as he dumps his stuff on the bed. After Alvaro arrives only to break up with her, Marta must learn to find the courage to stand up for herself and confront Angela and Eddie.

Cast
Blanca Lewin as Marta Piro
 as Alvaro
Matt Cavenaugh as Brad Steward
Frank Harts as Eddie
Shelley Thomas as Angela
Frank Nasso as Thuglio

References

External links
New Brooklyn at IMDb
New Brooklyn at Blind Studios
cosas.com, "Exclusivio, desde Nueve York, Pablo Cerda y bianca Lewins: Dos chilens en 'New Brooklyn'" (Spanish) (archived)
Article in El Mercurio (Spanish)
New Brooklyn blog
"New Brooklyn" at Rotten Tomatoes

2008 films
American drama films
2000s English-language films
2000s American films